In physics, a sigma model is a field theory that describes the field as a point particle confined to move on a fixed manifold. This manifold can be taken to be any Riemannian manifold, although it is most commonly taken to be either a Lie group or a symmetric space. The model may or may not be quantized. An example of the non-quantized version is the Skyrme model; it cannot be quantized due to non-linearities of power greater than 4. In general, sigma models admit (classical) topological soliton solutions, for example, the Skyrmion for the Skyrme model.  When the sigma field is coupled to a gauge field, the resulting model is described by Ginzburg–Landau theory.  This article is primarily devoted to the classical field theory of the sigma model; the corresponding quantized theory is presented in the article titled "non-linear sigma model".

Overview
The model served as the dominant prototype of spontaneous symmetry breaking of O(4) down to O(3): the three axial generators broken are the simplest manifestation of chiral symmetry breaking, the surviving unbroken O(3) representing isospin.

In conventional particle physics settings, the field is generally taken to be SU(N), or the vector subspace of quotient  of the product of left and right chiral fields.  In condensed matter theories, the field is taken to be O(N). For the rotation group O(3), the sigma model describes the isotropic ferromagnet; more generally, the O(N) model shows up in the quantum Hall effect, superfluid Helium-3 and spin chains. 

In supergravity models, the field is taken to be a symmetric space. Since symmetric spaces are defined in terms of their involution, their tangent space naturally splits into even and odd parity subspaces. This splitting helps propel the dimensional reduction of Kaluza–Klein theories.

In its most basic form, the sigma model can be taken as being purely the kinetic energy of a point particle; as a field, this is just the Dirichlet energy in Euclidean space.  

In two spatial dimensions, the O(3) model is completely integrable.

Definition
The Lagrangian density of the sigma model can be written in a variety of different ways, each suitable to a particular type of application. The simplest, most generic definition writes the Lagrangian as the metric trace of the pullback of the metric tensor on a Riemannian manifold. For  a field over a spacetime , this may be written as 

This expression can be unpacked a bit. The field space  can be chosen to be any Riemannian manifold. Riemannian manifolds always come with a metric tensor . The metric tensor on that patch is a matrix having components 

The base manifold  must be a differentiable manifold; by convention, it is either Minkowski space in particle physics applications, flat two-dimensional Euclidean space for condensed matter applications, or a Riemann surface, the worldsheet in string theory.

Example: O(N) non-linear sigma model
Taking  the Kronecker delta, i.e. the scalar dot product in Euclidean space, one gets the  non-linear sigma model. Then  the -sphere, the isometries of which are the rotation group . The Lagrangian can then be written as

For , this is the continuum limit of the isotropic ferromagnet on a lattice, i.e. of the classical Heisenberg model. For , this is the continuum limit of the  classical XY model. See also the n-vector model and the Potts model for reviews of the lattice model equivalents. The continuum limit is taken by writing 

as the finite difference on neighboring lattice locations  Then  in the limit , and  after dropping the constant terms  (the "bulk magnetization").

In geometric notation
The sigma model can also be written in a more fully geometric notation, as a fiber bundle with fibers  over a differentiable manifold .

 taking  

The  is a differential form. The sigma model action is then just the conventional inner product on vector-valued k-forms

This is an inner product in two different ways.

The above is an inner product on the space of square-integrable forms, conventionally taken to be the Sobolev space  In this way, one may write

This makes it explicit and plainly evident that the sigma model is just the kinetic energy of a point particle. From the point of view of the manifold , the field  is a scalar, and so  can be recognized just the ordinary gradient of a scalar function. The Hodge star is merely a fancy device for keeping track of the volume form when integrating on curved spacetime. In the case that  is flat, it can be completely ignored, and so the action is

Another way to convert this expression into a more easily-recognizable form is to observe that, for a scalar function  one has  and so one may also write 

where  is the Laplace–Beltrami operator, i.e. the ordinary Laplacian when  is flat.

That there is another, second inner product in play simply requires not forgetting that  is a vector from the point of view of  itself. That is, given any two vectors , the Riemannian metric  defines an inner product

Since  is vector-valued  on local charts, one also takes the inner product there as well.  More verbosely,

The tension between these two inner products can be made even more explicit by noting that 

is a bilinear form; it is a pullback of the Riemann metric . The individual  can be taken as vielbeins.  The Lagrangian density of the sigma model is then

for  the metric on   Given this gluing-together, the  can be interpreted as a solder form; this is articulated more fully, below.

Motivations and basic interpretations
Several interpretational and foundational remarks can be made about the classical (non-quantized) sigma model. The first of these is that the classical sigma model can be interpreted as a model of non-interacting quantum mechanics. The second concerns the interpretation of energy.

Interpretation as quantum-mechanics
This follows directly from the expression

given above. Taking , the function  can be interpreted as a wave function, and its Laplacian the kinetic energy of that wave function. The  is just some geometric machinery reminding one to integrate over all space. Assembling all these pieces together, the sigma model action is equivalent to 

To conclude, the classical sigma model on  can be interpreted as the quantum mechanics of a free, non-interacting quantum particle. Taking  is not enough to describe the -particle system, in that  particles require  distinct coordinates, which are not provided by the base manifold. This can be solved by taking  copies of the base manifold.

The solder form
It is very well-known that the geodesic structure of a Riemannian manifold is described by the Hamilton–Jacobi equations. In thumbnail form, the construction is as follows. The cotangent bundle , supplied with coordinate charts, can always be locally trivialized, i.e.

 

The trivialization supplies canonical coordinates  on the cotangent bundle.

 and 

The geodesic flow is the Hamiltonian flow; the solutions to the above are the geodesics of the manifold. Note, incidentally, that  along geodesics; the time parameter  is the distance along the geodesic.

In this sense, the interpretation of the sigma model as an energy functional is not surprising; it is in fact the gluing together of two energy functionals. Caution: the precise definition of a solder form requires it to be an isomorphism; this can only happen if  and  have the same real dimension. Furthermore, the conventional definition of a solder form takes  to be a Lie group. Both conditions are satisfied in various applications.

Results on various spaces
The space  is often taken to be a Lie group, usually SU(N), in the conventional particle physics models, O(N) in condensed matter theories, or as a symmetric space in supergravity models. Since symmetric spaces are defined in terms of their involution, their tangent space (i.e. the place where  lives) naturally splits into even and odd parity subspaces. This splitting helps propel the dimensional reduction of Kaluza–Klein theories.

On Lie groups
The Lagrangian can then be written as the pullback of the Killing form. Note that the Killing form can be written as a trace over two matrices from the corresponding Lie algebra; thus, the Lagrangian can also be written in a form involving the trace. With slight re-arrangements, it can also be written as the pullback of the Maurer–Cartan form.

On symmetric spaces
A common variation of the sigma model is to present it on a symmetric space. The prototypical example is the chiral model, which takes the product 

of the "left" and "right" chiral fields, and then constructs the sigma model on the "diagonal" 

Such a quotient space is a symmetric space, and so one can generically take  where  is the maximal subgroup of  that is invariant under the Cartan involution.

Trace notation
In physics, the most common and conventional statement of the sigma model begins with the definition

The  is a projection onto the odd-parity piece of the Cartan involution. The sigma model Lagrangian can then be written as

This is instantly recognizable as the first term of the Skyrme model.

Metric form
The equivalent metric form of this is to write a group element  as the geodesic  of an element  of the Lie algebra .

Plugging this directly into the above and applying the infinitesimal form of the Baker–Campbell–Hausdorff formula promptly leads to the equivalent expression

The article on the Baker–Campbell–Hausdorff formula provides an explicit expression for the vielbeins. They can be written as

The Lie commutator on  will not be within ; indeed, one has  and so a projection is still needed.

Extensions
The model can be extended in a variety of ways.  Besides the aforementioned Skyrme model, which introduces quartic terms, the model may be augmented by a torsion term to yield the Wess–Zumino–Witten model.

Another possibility is frequently seen in supergravity models.  Here, one notes that the Maurer–Cartan form  looks like "pure gauge". In the construction above for symmetric spaces, one can also consider the other projection

where, as before, the symmetric space corresponded to the split . This extra term can be interpreted as a connection on the fiber bundle  (it transforms as a gauge field). It can be endowed with its own dynamics, by writing 

Note that the differential here is just "d", and not a covariant derivative; this is not the Yang–Mills stress-energy tensor.

References

 

Quantum field theory
Equations of physics